Ông Đạo Dừa ("The Coconut Monk"), born Nguyễn Thành Nam (December 25 1910  – May 13 1990), was a Vietnamese mystic and the founder of the Coconut Religion (Đạo Dừa) in Vietnam.

Biography 
Born on December 25th 1910 as Nguyễn Thành Nam he was born in a village in Truc Giang district, Kien Hoa province. He was the son of a rich family.  On 1928, he went to France to study in Rouen. He graduated as a chemical engineer in 1935 and returned home. In 1945, he went to an pagoda in Bay Nui, Chau Doc. Following the law of momentum, he sat on the stone pedestal in front of the pagoda's pole for 3 years, silent day and night, endured the wind and dew, his body was only skin and bones. In 1948, he returned to Dinh Tuong and sat on the riverbank on the North Bridge, practicing religion while walking around. Two years later he build a 14-meter high religious station while practicing religion at night.

References

1909 births
1990 deaths
Founders of new religious movements
Religion in Vietnam
Vietnamese expatriates in France